Catriel Andrés Soto Auer (born 29 April 1987) is an Argentine cross-country mountain biker and road racing cyclist, who most recently rode for UCI Continental team .

Career 
Born in Colón, Soto competed at the 2012 Summer Olympics, in the Men's cross-country at Hadleigh Farm, finishing in 26th place. In 2015, Soto won the silver medal at the Pan American Games. He also participated at the 2011 Pan American Games, 2016 Summer Olympics and 2019 Pan American Games.

References

External links
 
 
 
 
 
 

1987 births
Living people
Argentine male cyclists
Cross-country mountain bikers
Olympic cyclists of Argentina
Cyclists at the 2012 Summer Olympics
Cyclists at the 2016 Summer Olympics
Pan American Games silver medalists for Argentina
Pan American Games medalists in cycling
Cyclists at the 2011 Pan American Games
Cyclists at the 2015 Pan American Games
Cyclists at the 2019 Pan American Games
Medalists at the 2015 Pan American Games
South American Games bronze medalists for Argentina
South American Games medalists in cycling
Competitors at the 2010 South American Games
Competitors at the 2014 South American Games
Sportspeople from Entre Ríos Province
21st-century Argentine people